Abel is an ancient lunar impact crater that lies near the southeast limb of the Moon's near side. It is located to the south of the crater Barnard, at the northwest edge of the Mare Australe.

The rim of Abel is heavily eroded and distorted in shape, forming a somewhat polygonal figure. It is incised and overlaid by past impacts. The satellite crater Abel A overlies the southern rim, while Abel M and Abel L intrude into the western wall.

The eastern floor of Abel has been resurfaced by past lava flows, leaving a relatively smooth, flat surface with a low albedo. The remains of a small crater rim protrude near the northeast wall. The western floor is rougher in texture and matches the albedo of the surrounding surface.

The crater was named for the Norwegian mathematician Niels Henrik Abel.

Satellite craters
By convention these features are identified on lunar maps by placing the letter on the side of the crater midpoint that is closest to Abel.

References

External links

 

Impact craters on the Moon
Niels Henrik Abel